Santiago de Surco, commonly known simply as Surco, is a district of Lima, Peru. It is bordered on the north with the district of Ate Vitarte and La Molina; on the east with San Juan de Miraflores, on the west with San Borja, Surquillo, Miraflores and Barranco, and on the south with Chorrillos.

Due to its relatively large area, it is a very heterogeneous district, having inhabitants belonging to all socio-economic levels.

The northern parts of Surco, which are close to San Borja and La Molina, are known as Monterrico and Chacarilla, and considerably more developed than the southern side of the district, having more upper-class housing and all four major shopping centers of the district.

Urban distribution 
Santiago de Surco or Surco, as it is commonly known, was awarded the title of "Garden District" four times in the management of Carlos Dargent Chamot. It is a district where a large part of the upper and upper middle class reside, however much of the entire district is inhabited by people from the middle class. Santiago de Surco covers the urbanizations of Valle Hermoso, Monterrico, Las Casuarinas, La Castellana, Los Álamos, La Floresta de Monterrico, Cerros de Camacho, Pancho Fierro, Santa Constanza, Chacarilla del Estanque, Higuereta, Neptuno, Tambo de Monterrico, El Dorado, Chama, Alborada, Liguria, Las Gardenias, Santa Teresa, Bella Luz, Vista Alegre, San Ignacio de Monterrico, Prolongación Benavides, Monterrico Sur, Los Rosales, La Capullana, Los Precursors, La Cruceta, Los Próceres, Santo Cristo, La Virreyna, San Roque, La Ensenada, San Pedrito, Sagitario, Surco Viejo or Surco Pueblo, Jorge Chávez, Santa María, Cercado de Surco, Los Parrales and Camino Real. In areas of high-income people, such as Las Casuarinas, access is totally restricted for the inhabitants there, since an invitation is required to access, apparently the price of these homes is usually the highest and most expensive in all of Lima. Even so, there are also upper-middle-class areas such as Chacarilla or other parts of Monterrico where access is free. Santiago de Surco is characterized for being a district of wide extension and with a great amount of green areas before San Borja, since it is a district of various contrasts, it is also characterized for being a very safe and orderly district.

Due to its large size, Surco is estimated to have around 60 small human settlements, located close to the border with Chorrillos, Barranco and San Juan de Miraflores. As in La Molina and San Borja, the houses of these human settlements are painted brick houses but keeping the popular style, others with no need for rendering, others with gardens, bars and even their own garages, or they can also keep an old construction such as the areas surrounding "old groove". Half of the population of these human settlements may be vulnerable and others may not, since many of them are lower and lower middle class. In AA HH such as "Rodrigo Franco", "My Peru" and "Golden Tooth" there may be vulnerable people, since there are houses built with "Triplay" wood, even so there are also several brick houses painted with gardens, paved tracks , modern sidewalks and great lighting, you can also see the presence of motorcycle taxis.

Culture, education and entertainment
Some of the most exclusive and prestigious universities of Lima are located in Surco, including University of Lima, ESAN University, Universidad Ricardo Palma, and Universidad Peruana de Ciencias Aplicadas. Other prestigious high-school institutions such as Markham College, Colegio Santa Margarita, Colegio Santa María Marianistas, Colegio de la Inmaculada and Colegio Cambridge are also located within the district.

Many of Lima's largest shopping centers are also located in the district, including "Jockey Plaza Shopping Center", "Caminos del Inca", "Chacarilla" and "El Polo". Santiago de Surco has won five awards for having some of the best-kept green areas in Lima.

La Vendimia (grapevine): The Viticulture Association and the Municipality of Surco sponsor this showcase for regional crafts, cuisine and wine processes within the framework of the "Vineyard Harvest of Surco." The craft of wine preparation is demonstrated through macerating grapes by the traditional method of treading by foot. Grape fermentation and aging processes are also shown. A Reina de la Vendimia (Queen of the Harvest) is chosen and local performers stage their talents. This seasonal festival takes place from March 17 to 26, annually and it is one of the most traditionalist festivities. It is celebrated in downtown Surco. 
The first Vendimia was started by Engineer Pedro Venturo Zapata Owner and operator of "Hacienda Higuereta y Anexos - Negociacion Vinicola Pedro Venturo S.A." (1925-1952)

Transport
Several of Lima's most important avenues pass through Surco, including the South Cone avenues, which connect the district with downtown Lima, Cono Sur districts, San Isidro (Lima's financial district), and Miraflores. Three stations of Line 1 of the Lima Metro (Jorge Chavez, Ayacucho and Cabitos) are located in the district.

History

The Santiago de Surco area was already populated before Inca times. During the Viceroyalty of Peru, Surco became a vacation spot for the wealthy. Back in those times, Surco comprised not only its current territory but also the area of present-day Barranco, Chorrillos, San Juan de Miraflores, Villa el Salvador and other areas.

One of the biggest attractions of Surco is the old Church San Juan Grande, which is currently under reconstruction. In earlier years this church remained unwatched and with no care from the municipality of Surco and was inhabited by locals in poverty.

It is said that this old church was communicated to the Santiago Apostol Cathedral a few miles from there in old Surco by a sort of underground passages built by the Jesuits to be used in case of war or danger. What is a fact is the old skulls and little babies bones found by curious people who walked in the catacums.

This church was built by the Jesuit order in 1752, using adobe, canes, stones and wood only.
The Jesuit order was expelled in 1767 from all the Spanish territories due to disagreements with the Spanish monarch Carlos III and then after their properties were confiscated. Thus this place was abandoned.  Thereafter,  this land was sold in an auction.  As a matter of fact, this land was divided into two pieces; A large(grande) parcel and a small one. The church then took its name from the large parcel, which was "grande" in Spanish.

This house-property was used as a shelter for Cáceres' troops in times of war. While sheltering at one point, Caceres didn't know from where the Chilean troops, who had just arrived a few hours earlier in Conchan, could attack the city. So he used the help of a young boy.
There was an immense 300-year-old pine tree in the patio that divided the church from the house-property, and even though it fell in January 2001, it remains unbroken in the collective memory of Surco as a silent witness to what happened. Julio César Escobar, the young boy, became a hero at the age of 13 during the San Juan and Miraflores battle by giving his life for the sake of the country. 
Julio climbed up to the top of the pine tree, to be a lookout and warn Caceres about the Chilean troops' approach. When Julio saw the Chileans, he was too high to climb down to warn about the Chilean troops' arrival. The Peruvian troops fled from the shooting that had begun and Julio was not able to escape. Unfortunately, the patriots were defeated, and the kid hero was shot dead near the immense tree.
The church was then sacked and burned by the Chilean troops, who later converted it into a stable.

The old district of San José de Surco was created by Law 6644 on December 16, 1929 out of the Barranco District, and in 1944 Santiago de Surco district is renamed and get territories from the old Ate district.

Education

The Humboldt II campus of the Deutsche Schule Lima Alexander von Humboldt (Colegio Peruano Alemán Alexander von Humboldt), a German international school, is located in Surco.

The Asociación Academia de Cultura Japonesa, a Japanese international school, is in Surco.

Sister cities
List of sister cities, designated by Sister Cities International:
 Gastonia, North Carolina, United States
 Providencia, RM, Chile

References

External links
  Municipalidad Distrital de Santiago de Surco - Santiago de Surco district council official website

Districts of Lima